Denain is a commune in the Nord department in northern France.  Denain had a population of 19,877, on a land area of 11.52 km² (4.448 sq mi).

It is the largest of 47 communes which comprise the Communauté d'agglomération de la Porte du Hainaut, which in 2017 had a total population of 158,754.

History 
A mere village in the beginning of the 19th century, its population rapidly increased from 1850 until 1962, when it had 29,467 inhabitants. Since then its population declined by about 30%.

Its vicinity was the scene of the decisive victory gained in 1712 by Marshal Villars over the allies commanded by Prince Eugene of Savoy; and the battlefield is marked by a monolithic monument inscribed with the verses of Voltaire: "" ("See in Denain bold Villars/Fighting the eagle of the Caesars").

Denain was an important centre in the industrial revolution, first for coal-mining from 1720, and steelworks from around 1839. The closure of the large Usinor steelworks at Denain was announced in 1978, and the works finally closed in 1988. Émile Zola is thought to have conducted research into the working of the mine and mining communities by visiting Denain before writing Germinal. A primary school, a park and a road in Denain bear the name of the novelist.

Former mayor Patrick Roy was also a deputy and became famous for the support for heavy metal music he expressed at the National Assembly on various occasions.

Population

Heraldry
The arms of Denain are blazoned :

Notable residents

 Fabien Gilot (born 1984), Olympic and world champion swimmer

See also
 Battle of Denain
Communes of the Nord department

References

External links

Official website (in French)

Communes of Nord (French department)